Santa Cruz is the name of three barangays in the Camarines Norte province:
Santa Cruz in Jose Panganiban
Santa Cruz in Labo
Santa Cruz in Talisay